Tetherow is a census-designated place (CDP) in Deschutes County, Oregon, United States. It is part of the Bend, Oregon Metropolitan Statistical Area. The population was 45 at the 2010 census.

Geography
Tetherow is located in central Deschutes County along the western edge of the city of Bend, the county seat and largest city in the county.

Demographics

References

Census-designated places in Oregon
Unincorporated communities in Deschutes County, Oregon
Census-designated places in Deschutes County, Oregon
Unincorporated communities in Oregon